Lupin is a 2007 Philippine television drama action series broadcast by GMA Network. The series is loosely based on a series of French fictional crime novels featuring the Arsène Lupin by Maurice Leblanc. Directed by Mike Tuviera and Lore Reyes, it stars Richard Gutierrez in the title role. It premiered on April 9, 2007 on the network's Telebabad line up. The series concluded on August 17, 2007 with a total of 95 episodes.

The series was released in DVD by GMA Records.

Overview

Created by Maurice Leblanc, Arsène Lupin first appeared in a series of short stories serialized in 1905 and published in book form as Arsène Lupin, gentleman-cambrioleur in 1907 (translated into English as The Extraordinary Adventures of Arsene Lupin, Gentleman-Burglar).

Born in the late 19th century, Lupin is a gentleman thief, a master of disguise, and an amateur detective. While operating on the wrong side of the law, he is still a force for good. Those whom Lupin defeats are worse villains than he. Other characters in the stories include Lupin's faithful accomplice Grognard and his lawman adversary Inspector Justin Ganimard. In some stories Lupin faces Arthur Conan Doyle's Sherlock Holmes (called "Herlock Sholmès" for copyright reasons).

The Lupin stories have been adapted for television (including animation), cinema, and comics.

Cast and characters

Lead cast
 Richard Gutierrez as André Lupin / Lupin De Dios / Xedric Apacer

Supporting cast
 Janno Gibbs as Inspector Clavio Angeles
 Katrina Halili as Veronica Arkanghel / Ashley Calibr
 Rhian Ramos as Avril Legarda
 Ehra Madrigal as Brigitte Maisog
 Boy2 Quizon as Castor
 Tirso Cruz III as Fundador "Duroy" De Dios
 Ricky Davao as Moon Raven
 Lani Mercado as Cecilia Lupin
 Ara Mina as Anna Nicole
 Polo Ravales as Josh Apacer
 Bearwin Meily as Danggoy
 Alicia Alonzo as Nelia
 Ramon Christopher Gutierrez as Perez
 Almira Muhlach as Victoria Apacer
 LJ Reyes as Elaine
 Sandy Talag as Angela

Guest cast
 Michael de Mesa as Minggoy Buang / Miguel Apacer
 Elvis Gutierrez as Sundance Raven
 Melissa Mendez as Edith Legarda
 Alyssa Alano as Marry
 Dick Israel as Jouquin Bagbag
 Benjie Paras as Generoso / Jenny
 Debraliz as Guring
 Andrew Wolfe as Adonis Angeles
 Dante Rivero
 Bing Davao
 Patricia Ysmael as Christa
 Rea Nakpil as Trixie
 Gerard Pizzaras as Ernie
 Neil Ryan Sese as Lopez
 Sheree as Virgin
 Abby Cruz as Angeli Villavicer
 January Isaac as Jorja
 John Apacible as Maskardo
 Tuesday Vargas as Magdalene
 Roy Alvarez as Ybrahim Santiago
 Nonie Buencamino as Arsenio Lupin
 Joyce Jimenez as Courtney Amor
 Giselle Sanchez as Sanaita
 Rez Cortez as Milyones
 Kier Legaspi as Katas
 Paul Alvarez as Uno
 Mang Enriquez as Enriquez
 Gary Estrada as Captain Rosas
 Joyce Ching as young Brigitte Maisog
 Mon Confiado

References

External links
 

2007 Philippine television series debuts
2007 Philippine television series endings
Television shows based on Arsène Lupin
Filipino-language television shows
GMA Network drama series
Philippine action television series
Television shows set in the Philippines